The 1886 Nova Scotia general election was held from 8 June to 15 June 1886 to elect members of the 29th House of Assembly of the Province of Nova Scotia, Canada. It was won by the Liberal party.

Results

Results by party

Retiring incumbents
Liberal
William Buchanan, Cape Breton
Thomas Lewis Dodge, Kings
Isidore LeBlanc, Richmond
William F. McCurdy, Victoria
William Thomas Pipes, Cumberland
Alonzo J. White, Cape Breton

Liberal-Conservative
William Blair, Colchester
John Archibald McDonald, Victoria

Nominated candidates
1886 Nova Scotia Provincial Election

Legend
bold denotes party leader
† denotes an incumbent who is not running for re-election or was defeated in nomination contest

Valley

|-
| rowspan="2"|Annapolis
||
|James Wilberforce Longley1,55625.25%
|
|R. J. Ellison1,53124.85%
|
|
||
|James Wilberforce Longley
|-	
|
|Henry M. Munro1,53524.91%	
||
|Frank Andrews1,54024.99%
|
|
||
|Henry M. Munro
|-
| rowspan="2"|Digby
||
|Henri M. Robicheau1,10842.35%	
|
|Robert G. Munroe52219.95%	
|
|
||
|Henri M. Robicheau
|-
||
|John S. McNeill98637.69%	
|
|	
|
|
||
|John S. McNeill
|-
| rowspan="2"|Hants
||
|Allen Haley1,55225.50%	
|
|Allan MacDougall1,50824.77%	
|
|
||
|Allen Haley
|-
||
|Archibald Frame1,52225.00%	
|
|Nathaniel Spence1,50524.72%	
|
|
||
|Nathaniel Spence
|-
| rowspan="2"|Kings
|
|Alfred P. Welton1,53524.92%
||
|William C. Bill1,56025.32%	
|
|
||
|Thomas Lewis Dodge†
|-	
||
|Leander Rand1,63526.54%
|
|Thomas R. Harris1,43023.21%	
|
|
||
|Thomas R. Harris
|-
|}

South Shore

|-
| rowspan="2"|Lunenburg
||
|Charles Edward Church1,92429.13%	
|
|Charles A. Smith1,47522.33%	
|
|
||
|Charles Edward Church
|-
||
|George A. Ross1,79827.22%	
|
|Aubrey B. Caldwell1,40821.32%	
|
|
||
|George A. Ross
|-
| rowspan="2"|Queens
||
|Jason M. Mack78729.25%	
|
|Leander Ford62223.11%	
|
|
||
|Jason M. Mack
|-
||
|Joseph H. Cook76228.32%	
|
|James C. Bartling52019.32%	
|
|
||
|Joseph H. Cook
|-
| rowspan="2"|Shelburne
||
|Thomas Johnston1,18830.97%	
|
|Alfred K. Smith86022.42%	
|
|
||
|Thomas Johnston
|-
||
|William F. MacCoy1,06327.71%	
|
|Charles Cahan72518.90%	
|
|
||
|William F. MacCoy
|-
| rowspan="2"|Yarmouth
||
|Albert Gayton1,64339.43%
|
|	
|
|
||
|Albert Gayton
|-
||
|William Law1,74541.88%
|
|Thomas Corning77918.69%	
|
|
||
|Thomas Corning
|-
|}

Fundy-Northeast

|-
| rowspan="2"|Colchester
||
|George Clarke2,05327.47%	
|
|S. E. Gourley1,70022.75%	
|
|
||
|William Blair†
|-
||
|Frederick Andrew Laurence1,93825.93%	
|
|William Albert Patterson1,78223.85%
|
|
||
|William Albert Patterson
|-
| rowspan="2"|Cumberland
||
|Thomas Reuben Black2,08325.15%
|
|C. J. Macfarlane1,85522.40%	
|
|James B. Wilson3414.12%
||
|Thomas Reuben Black
|-	
|
|George W. Forrest1,93923.41%	
||
|Richard L. Black2,06424.92%
|
|
||
|William Thomas Pipes†
|-
|}

Halifax

|-
| rowspan="3"|Halifax
||
|William Stevens Fielding4,04219.76%
|
|John Y. Payzant2,81613.76%
|
|
||
|William Stevens Fielding
|-
||
|Michael Joseph Power3,82218.68%	
|
|J. N. Lyons2,86614.01%
|
|
||
|Michael Joseph Power
|-	
||
|William Roche3,93119.21%
|
|William D. Harrington2,98114.57%	
|
|
||
|William D. Harrington
|-
|}

Central Nova

|-
| rowspan="2"|Antigonish
||
|Angus McGillivray1,38434.30%	
|
|Rod K. McDonald48211.95%	
|
|
||
|Angus McGillivray
|-
||
|Colin Francis McIsaac1,26931.45%	
|
|Charles B. Whidden90022.30%	
|
|
||
|Charles B. Whidden
|-
| rowspan="2"|Guysborough
||
|James A. Fraser1,03633.67%	
|
|Joseph William Hadley56518.36%	
|
|
||
|John A. Fraser
|-
||
|Otto Schwartz Weeks93130.26%	
|
|J. F. L. Parsons54517.71%	
|
|
||
|Otto Schwartz Weeks
|-
| rowspan="3"|Pictou
||
|Jeffrey McColl2,60616.70%
|
|Robert Hockin2,56516.44%	
|
|
||
|Robert Hockin
|-	
|
|John D. McLeod2,51416.11%
||
|Charles H. Munro2,57816.52%	
|
|
||
|Charles H. Munro
|-	
|
|Robert Drummond2,49816.01%	
||
|Adam Carr Bell2,84418.22%
|
|
||
|Adam Carr Bell
|-
|}

Cape Breton

|-
| rowspan="2"|Cape Breton	
|
|George Henry Murray1,25324.13%
||
|Colin Chisholm1,63331.44%	
|
|
||
|Alonzo J. White†
|-	
|
|Ronald Gillies74514.35%
||
|William MacKay1,56230.08%	
|
|
||
|William Buchanan†
|-
| rowspan="2"|Inverness
||
|John McKinnon1,85431.13%	
|
|Angus MacLennan1,36322.89%	
|
|
||
|Angus MacLennan
|-
||
|Daniel McNeil1,76429.62%	
|
|Alexander Campbell97416.36%	
|
|
||
|Alexander Campbell
|-
| rowspan="3"|Richmond
|
|Angus S. McLean45519.65%
||
|David A. Hearn53423.07%	
|
|
||
|Isidore LeBlanc†
|-	
||
|Joseph Matheson61626.61%
|rowspan=2|
|rowspan=2|Murdoch McRae31613.65%	
|rowspan=2|
|rowspan=2|
|rowspan=2 |
|rowspan=2|Murdoch McRae
|-
|
|Charles LeNoir39417.02%
|-
| rowspan="3"|Victoria
|
|John J. McCabe38513.21%
|
|Murdoch G. McLeod46315.89%
||
|John Lemuel Bethune77926.74%
||
|John Archibald McDonald†
|-	
|rowspan=2 |
|rowspan=2|John A. Fraser51017.51%	
|
|John Morrison40814.01%
|rowspan=2|
|rowspan=2|
|rowspan=2 |
|rowspan=2|William F. McCurdy†
|-
|
|John Munroe36812.63%
|-
|}

References

1886
1886 elections in Canada
1886 in Nova Scotia
June 1886 events